The following list provides information relating to the minimum wages (gross) of countries in Europe.

The calculations are based on the assumption of a 40-hour working week and a 52-week year, with the exceptions of France (35 hours), San Marino (37.5 hours), Belgium (38 hours), United Kingdom (38 hours), Germany (38 hours), Ireland (39 hours) and Monaco (39 hours). Most minimum wages are fixed at a monthly rate, but some countries set their minimum wage at an hourly rate or annual rate.

Minimum wages by country

Net income 
The map below shows monthly adult minimum (after tax, social charges & deductions) income; some countries have a lower rate for under-25-year-olds.

Countries marked on the map in dark red do not have a minimum wage.

Gross income 
The map below shows monthly (before tax, social charges & deductions) minimum adult income; some countries have a lower rate for under-25-year-olds.

Countries marked on the map in dark red do not have a minimum wage.

The disparity between the gross and net income ratios, across countries, is given by the differences in national tax systems.

Minimum wages by country

Minimum wages by country (other countries)
Countries that have main territories in Asia, with small or no territories in Europe:

Minimum wages by country (other territories)
The following list includes states with limited recognition:

Countries with no minimum wage 
In some countries, minimum wage has been replaced with another system to provide an income.

See Guaranteed minimum income and Basic income.

 

 (Except for 9 selected industries that have minimum wage set by law, to protect vulnerable workers.)

 (Except cantons of Basel-Stadt, Jura, Neuchâtel, Ticino, and Geneva)

For comparison

See also
 List of European Union member states by minimum wage
 List of European countries by average wage
 International organisations in Europe
 List of European countries by budget revenues per capita
 List of European countries by GNI (nominal) per capita
 List of minimum wages by country
 List of countries by GDP (nominal)
 List of countries by GDP (PPP)

References

External links 
 Eurostat, Monthly minimum wages - bi-annual data
 Eurostat, Minimum wage statistics
 Google - public data: Minimum Wage in Europe



Minimum wage
EU